The Hidden One is a 1956 Mexican drama film directed by Roberto Gavaldón. It was entered into the 1956 Cannes Film Festival.

Cast
 María Félix - Gabriela
 Pedro Armendáriz - Felipe Rojano
 Andrés Soler - General Nemesio Garza
 Arturo Martínez - Don Cosme
 Domingo Soler - Tata Agustino Rojano
 Jorge Martínez de Hoyos - Máximo Tepal
 Carlos Agostí - Octavio Montero
 Sara Guasch - Hortensia
 Miguel Manzano - Don Chente 
 Carlos Riquelme - Doctor Herrerías 
 Eduardo Alcaraz - Señor Ariza 
 Rafael Alcayde - Ranch Master (as Rafael Alcaide) 
 Alfredo Wally Barrón - Don Ventura (uncredited)
 Lupe Carriles - Woman in mourning (uncredited)
 Arturo Castro - Train conductor (uncredited)
 José Chávez - Train employee (uncredited)
 Alicia del Lago - Woman who throws stone at Gabriela (uncredited)
 Manuel Dondé - One-Eyed Man (uncredited)
 Lidia Franco - Gossipy woman in window (uncredited)
 Emilio Garibay - Capitain (uncredited)
 Elodia Hernández - Gossipy woman in window (uncredited)
 Héctor Mateos - Court of Justice Chief (uncredited)
 Raúl Meraz - Capitain Romero (uncredited)
 Inés Murillo - Maid of Doctor (uncredited)
 Manuel Sánchez Navarro - Deputy (uncredited)
 Cuco Sánchez - Singer (uncredited)
 Hernán Vera - Sales Collector (uncredited)
 Nora Veryán - Woman who sells mead to Gabriela (uncredited)

References

External links

1956 films
1956 drama films
1950s Spanish-language films
Films directed by Roberto Gavaldón
Mexican Revolution films
Mexican drama films
1950s Mexican films